Kalālah is a term in Islamic inheritance which refers to a someone that has an estate, but no direct ascendants or descendants.

Notes

Sources
 

Islamic terminology